Karumadikkuttan is a 2001 Indian Malayalam-language drama film directed by Vinayan and written by J. Pallasserry, starring Kalabhavan Mani, Kausalya and Suresh Krishna. The film also has Bharathi, Janardhanan, Sai Kumar Ganesh, Rajan P. Dev, Athira, Shivaji, Priyanka and Meena Ganesh in the cast.

The film features a soundtrack by Mohan Sithara, cinematography by Azhagappan, and editing by G. Murali. It is produced and distributed by Samson J. Paanaadan of Surabhi Cinema. The film was a commercial success at the box office. The film was remade in Tamil as Azhagesan (2004) starring Sathyaraj andi in Telugu as Konaseemalo Chittemma Kittayya (2016) starring Alla Rambabu and Gurleen Chopra.

Plot
The protagonist of the film, Kuttan, is a 30-year-old man, but he has the intelligence of a 10-year-old. People call him Karumadikkuttan as he is dark. Everyone has affection for him, and he too is always ready to do anything for anybody in the village. The remuneration that he gets for any job somehow is never above five rupees. But he works really hard when he is terribly hungry just for the sake of this meagre amount. And he has no complaints against anybody. People even ridicule him. But he thinks only of the positive aspects of things and has no grudge against anybody.  He is in love with his cousin Nandini, a college student. Neelakandan is the village landlord who is a cunning man and has grabbed all the wealth from Nandini's father a few years back. Neelakandan has a son Sekhar, who is a womanizer. 

Nandini and her college professor fall in love with each other. He proposes to marry her, and she accepts. Sekhar, who has an eye on Nandini, is humiliated and slapped by Nandini while he tries to misbehave with her. As a means of revenge, Sekhar kicks Nandini and her grandmother out of their house. Nandini's marriage is immediately stopped, and her grandmother falls ill.

Kuttan accommodates them in his small house. Later, Nandini's grandmother dies, and Nandini is raped by Sekhar. Nandini gets pregnant but aborts with Neelakandan's daughter's support. Neelakandan wants to take Nandini to his house and marry Sekhar, but she refuses, and Kuttan humiliates Neelakandan. Sekhar decides to kill Kuttan. First, he kills Kuttan's family friend Govindan Nair. In the meantime, Neelakandan dies because of his illness. Sekhar's henchmen beat Kuttan, and Nandini kills Sekhar.

A few years later, Nandini is released from jail and lives happily with Kuttan.

Cast

Production
The film's was shot from Kuttanad, Kerala. About the film, Vinayan says: "We never try to look into the minds and sorrows of the mentally ill people around us. They too long for love. And love, when given to them could take them to heights. That’s what I am trying to tell in this film." About his character, Kalabhavan Mani says: "I have done my best to give life to the character of a mentally ill person. I have observed the mannerisms of mentally ill people and have performed accordingly."

Soundtrack 
The film's soundtrack contains 12 songs, all composed by Mohan Sithara, with lyrics by Yusufali Kechery.

Box office
The film was both critical and commercial success.

References

External links
 
 Karumadikkuttan at the Malayalam Movie Database
 karumadikkuttan Malayalam

Films scored by Mohan Sithara
2000s Malayalam-language films
Indian drama films
Films shot in Alappuzha
Malayalam films remade in other languages
Films directed by Vinayan